Ramón Subercaseaux Vicuña (10 April 1854, Valparaíso – 19 January 1937 Viña del Mar) was a Chilean painter, politician and diplomat.

Biography 
He was the youngest of thirteen children born to a prominent, wealthy family. His grandfather was a French-born physician, who was one of the pioneers of Chile's mining industry. His father, was a businessman who served in the Chilean Senate. He studied at the Colegio San Ignacio from 1854 to 1859, and at the Instituto Nacional. From 1871 to 1874, he read law at the University of Chile. 
 
 
He finally decided to give up law and became largely self-taught in drawing and oil painting. That same year, he went to Rome where he took classes from the Spanish painter, José García Ramos.

In 1879, he married Amalia Errázuriz Urmeneta, the daughter of Maximiano Errázuriz and sister of the painter, José Tomás Errázuriz. That same year, he was elected to the Chilean Congress as an Alternate Deputy for Angol, representing the Conservative Party. Altogether, they had six children, including Pedro, an artist and Benedictine monk; Luis, an athlete and politician; and Juan, who became the Archbishop of La Serena. In 1882, after finishing his term in Congress, he became the Chilean consul in Paris.

Diplomatic career
In 1897, he went back to Europe; this time as a full-fledged diplomat. He served in Italy and Germany, where  Kaiser Wilhelm II's support for Chile was instrumental in preventing war with Argentina. During this time, he also began to write. He returned to Chile in 1903 and, three years later, was elected a Senator, representing  Arauco Province, serving until 1912. He was appointed Minister of Foreign Affairs by Juan Luis Sanfuentes in 1915, and held that office for a year.
 
After serving as President of the Catholic University's extension school, and several commissions, he returned to diplomatic work in 1924 when he became Chile's Ambassador to the Holy See. He served in that position for six years. His term was notable for the fact that, during his tenure, the Chilean Congress enacted the Constitution of 1925, which established the separation of church and state, yet relations with Pope Pius XI remained cordial.

Over the course of his diplomatic career, he was awarded the Prussian Order of the Crown, First Class and the Order of the Crown of Italy, Grand Cross.

Selected writings 

 Memorias de 50 años, Imprenta y litografía Barcelona, Santiago, 1908 Online @ Google books.
 Memorias de ochenta años: recuerdos personales, críticas, remiscencias históricas, viajes, anécdotas, 2 vols. Nascimento, 1936
 El genio de Roma; el Lacio y la campiña romana, héroes y poetas, los papas, Unione Editrice, Rome, 1911

See also
Subercaseaux family
A Portrait of the Daughters of Ramón Subercaseaux

References

Further reading 
 Isabel Cruz, Ramón Subercaseaux, multifacético itinerario de un artista diplomático. El Mercurio (2008) 
 Verónica Griffin Barros, Ramón Subercaseaux, retrospectiva de un hombre notable. (exhibition catalog) Corporación Cultural de Las Condes (1999)

External links 

Ramón Subercaseaux @ Artistas Plásticos Chilenos. (more paintings and documentary material)

1854 births
1937 deaths
Chilean diplomats
Conservative Party (Chile) politicians
People from Valparaíso
Ambassadors of Chile to the Holy See
Chilean politicians
19th-century Chilean painters
19th-century Chilean male artists
Chilean male artists
20th-century Chilean painters
20th-century male artists
Chilean male painters
Subercaseaux family
Male painters
Foreign ministers of Chile